Marhaň is a village and municipality in Bardejov District in the Prešov Region of north-east Slovakia.

History
In historical records the village was first mentioned in 1277

Geography
The municipality lies at an altitude of 195 metres and covers an area of 10.381 km².
It has a population of about 935 people.

References

External links
 
 

Villages and municipalities in Bardejov District
Šariš